Building at 419 West Baltimore Street, also known as Harry Guss Inc., is a historic retail and wholesale building located at Baltimore, Maryland, United States. It is a three-story gable-roofed Flemish bond brick Federal-style building built about 1840. Around 1875, a four-bay cast-iron storefront was added at street level.  It was used in the garment manufacturing and sales industries.

Building at 419 West Baltimore Street was listed on the National Register of Historic Places in 1994.

References

External links
, including photo from 1987, at Maryland Historical Trust

Cast-iron architecture in Baltimore
Commercial buildings on the National Register of Historic Places in Baltimore
Commercial buildings completed in 1840
Downtown Baltimore
Federal architecture in Maryland